McAuley Park is a small public municipal park at the intersection of Kingsway and Fraser Street in Vancouver, British Columbia, Canada.

Name 
The park is named after Harvey and Theresa McAuley, whose extensive and lengthy volunteer contributions to the community were honoured by the City of Vancouver.

Events 
The park has been the venue for several multi-cultural festivals, hosted by the Dickens Community Group. Other events held in the park include a jerk chicken festival and displays by local artists.

Parks in Vancouver